Children's Aid Societies (CAS) in Ontario, Canada, are separate, independent organizations which have each been approved by the Ontario government's Ministry of Children and Youth Services to provide child protection services. The declared goal of CASs is to "promote the best interests, protection and well being of children".

Their principal goals are to:
 investigate reports or evidence of abuse or neglect of children under the age of 18 or in the society's care or supervision , where necessary, take steps to protect the children
 care for and supervise children who come under their care or supervision
 counsel and support families for the protection of children or to prevent circumstances requiring the protection of children
 place children for adoption

These societies receive funding from, and are under the supervision of the Ontario Ministry of Children, Community and Social Services. However, they are regarded as a Non-governmental organization (NGO), which allows CASs a large degree of autonomy from interference or direction in the day-to-day running of the Societies by the Ministry. There are 49 children's aid societies across Ontario, including 11 Indigenous societies. An oversight body known as The Child and Family Services Review Board exists to investigate complaints against a CAS and maintains authority to issue orders against the Societies.

Authority
Children's Aid Societies have authority under provincial legislation to remove children from homes where they face either a risk of harm, or have experienced harm. Children who cannot remain with caregivers are sometimes placed with other family members ("kin"), family friends ("kith"), or in customary care, which is an option for aboriginal children. In other cases, children can be placed into foster homes or group homes, as well as being adopted.

Statistics

Over the 12-month period from April 1, 2007 to March 31, 2008, Ontario's Children's Aid Societies provided child welfare services to communities across Ontario. There were 77,089 allegations of child abuse and neglect investigated in Ontario. 27,816 Children were in the care of Children's Aid Society for protection from abuse and neglect. Of the children who were cared for by a society during the year, 9,468 came into care upon completion of abuse investigations. Of these, 6,565 children had not previously been in care and 2,903 children were returned to care due to new child protection concerns. Less than 1% of Ontario's 3 million children were in the care of Children's Aid Societies in the year 2007.

Conversely, during the 12 months between January 1, 2007 and December 31, 2007, The Office of the Chief Coroner of Ontario reviewed 91 cases including 18 Medical and 73 CAS cases that had received service during that time or up to 12 months previously. The causes of death were determined to be: • Medical: Natural, 17; Accident, 0; Homicide, 0; Suicide, 1; Undetermined, 0. • CAS: Natural, 10; Accident, 23; Homicide, 10; Suicide, 8; Undetermined, 15; Still under investigation, 7.

On their website, a Children's Aid Society makes the claim that most of the children who they visit remain in their homes; The number of children coming into care each year has continued to decline, in line with the general downward trend in Ontario's child population. In 2007/08 9,468 children came into care, a 26% decline compared to 2003/04. The rate of admissions into care was 3 children per 1000 of Ontario's children population. Ontario's leading academic study on child abuse and neglect states that exposure to intimate partner violence represents the largest proportion of substantiated maltreatment investigations. Almost half (48 percent) of all substantiated investigations identified exposure to intimate partner violence as the primary form of maltreatment (an estimated 20,443 investigations or 8.70 investigations per 1,000 children).

Children's Aid Societies also provide assessments, crisis intervention, counseling and services to prevent child abuse and neglect. In addition, Children's Aid Societies help vulnerable families protect and support their children. Many prevention programs are offered in partnership with other community agencies. Child protection workers also work to support families in crisis where their children are not in need of protection. A child protection worker remains involved with the family to ensure the appropriate supports and community services are in place. In 2007/08, 24,955 families received ongoing support from Children's Aid Societies where a child was in need of protection.

Advocacy group membership

Ontario Association of Children's Aid Societies (OACAS) is a membership organization representing CASs in Ontario, Canada. Influencing government decisions, funding, and public opinion by promoting child welfare issues is a critical goal.

Failures to provide for the needs of children

Every year the Office of the Coroner publishes a report on all children who died aged 5 and under all children who died while being served by a Children's Aid Society including children who were served up to 12 months prior to their deaths. These reviews are completed by the Pediatric Death Review Committee (PDRC)

2009 Deaths Occurring and Reported by a Children's Aid Society:

Total Cases 120 Executive Review Only in 2009 74 Pending DU5C 2010/2011 10 Internal & PDRC Review 2010/2011 36
Note: these categories are explained below in more detail.

As per the Joint Directive for the reporting and reviewing of all child deaths known to a children's aid society within 12 months of the death, 120 child deaths were reported to the PDRC in 2009. In each case the CAS that provided service to the family submitted a serious occurrence report and within 14 days of the death submitted a Child Fatality Case Summary Report to the PDRC. The Executive Committee of the PDRC screens these reports and, within 7 days, a decision is made whether the CAS will be required to complete an Internal Review for the purposes of a future PDRC review. The decision to request an Internal Review is based on the criteria set out in the Joint Directive.

The Executive Committee of the PDRC reviewed all 120 deaths and requested Society Internal Reviews be submitted in 36 of them. A decision on 10 other cases is pending the anticipated review by the Deaths Under 5 Committee where cause and manner of death will be determined. It was determined that 74 of the 120 cases would not necessitate further review given the nature of the child's death and/or the Society's involvement. The majority of these cases were medically fragile infants or children who died as a result of natural causes, most of whom were in hospital born prematurely or with complex medical and/or genetic conditions. Most deaths are not reviewed in the year of death due to these timelines, the volume of cases, and the length of time required to complete a coroner's investigation, including various tests and reports. Additionally, cases before the criminal courts are generally not reviewed until any outstanding charges are resolved.

Explanations: Executive Review Only: Are cases which, when reviewed by the Executive Committee of the PDRC (Chair and Coordinators), it is determined that no further review by the CAS or PDRC is required, as the death could not reasonably have been prevented or predicted by a CAS or medical intervention. For example, cases where the child's family had no CAS involvement until shortly before the death, or the child was known to CAS, but the death was natural and not unexpected, or the child died as the result of an incident unrelated to the family's involvement with CAS (i.e. child died in a car accident and the case was open to assist the parents in managing the behaviour of a different child).

Pending DU5C: On occasion, the decision to request an Internal Child Death Review is postponed pending the results of the coroner's investigation and/or review by the Deaths Under 5 Committee.

Internal & PDRC Review: If the PDRC requests an Internal Child Death Review, agencies are given 90 days in which to submit their report, and the PDRC has up to 12 months to review the case and issue a report that may contain further recommendations. Expectations for such reviews are explained on this page.

CAS Status of Children Who Died in 2009 • 19 (16%) of the 120 reported child deaths in 2009 were in the care of a CAS; eight of those were crown wards. Additionally, two youths were living on Extended Care and Maintenance (ECM). • 101 (84%) of the deaths involved children living with families who had received CAS services in the previous 12 months. • 43 of the 120 deaths of children were considered to be medically fragile meaning their deaths were not sudden or unexpected; this included 12 of the 19 children in care.

In its Child Welfare Report, 2009–10, the Ontario Association of Children's Aid Societies reports the following: • Ontario CASs provided substitute care to more than 27,000 children in 2008-09 •There were 17,876 children in care of a CAS on March 31, 2009 • 9,200 of those children and youth in care are permanent wards • Over 28% of the 2,112 Aboriginal children in care of four of six designated agencies are in customary care arrangements. • Ontario has the second lowest rate of children in care in Canada at 6.4 per 1,000 •The most common reasons children and youth are admitted to care are: 1. neglect 2. emotional harm 3. physical harm 4. sexual harm 5. domestic violence 6. problematic behaviour of the child • Children in care account for approximately 1 in 10 cases serviced by a CAS • In 90% of families receiving services from a CAS, children remain at home 

Children's Aid Societies have been found guilty of incompetence, negligence and malicious prosecution. In 2010 a Psychologist employed by Durham CAS was found guilty for misrepresenting his qualifications.

Hundreds of children under supervision of CAS have died in the last few years but CAS will not release much information citing privacy concerns.

In the province of Ontario, the majority of front-line CAS workers are not registered social workers. Several groups, including Canadacourtwatch.org posting Case Law and Canada Court Watch.com's public protest efforts have brought these issues to light, citing concerns with respect to accountability.

Controversy

Powerful As God, a 2011 film focusing on the first hand experiences of 26 individuals who witnessed the social devastation caused by the Ontario CAS in recent years, reveals a hidden world of corruption, power hunger and incompetence that has been hidden from the scrutiny of the public eye for many decades. This award-winning film was produced and published by the Documentary Media (MFA) Program, Ryerson University and can be viewed online.

In March 2013, The Toronto Star published an article about a leaked memo which would suggest that the CAS are funded on open cases and on a per-child basis. In this memo, Peel workers were urged to delay the closing of files for as long as possible sparking controversy with parents with open files and children in care. Families who are separated by court orders who should return were met with high resistance by the CAS. This is also the potential proof that the funding model that CAS is currently receiving is being corrupted to achieve maximum funding by the government.

References

External links

 Child and Family Services Act
 Canadian Charter of Rights and Freedoms
 StopCas.ca - Advocacy to disband the CAS and replace with an Ontario Government Dept. of Child Protection.
 Life In Foster Care Is Like A Subway Ride (A CBC Radio documentary which takes you on a 13-minute virtual subway ride through foster care by a Canadian foster care survivor John Dunn of http://www.johnsinformation.com)
 CanadaCourtWatch.ORG - Enhanced Watchdog for Ontario CAS abuse with Canadian Case Law searches published.
 Canada Court Watch.com - Court watchdog focusing on CAS related issues.
 Ryerson University documentary film of CAS abuses, 'Powerful as God'.
 Misleading Government CAS resources, brochures in: BAD Self-Help Law Books - PDF

Adoption-related organizations
Children's charities based in Canada
Social work organizations in Canada